Centromyrmex is a pantropical, though mainly Afrotropical, genus of ants in the subfamily Ponerinae. This ponerine ant was recorded for the first time in French Guiana and the most northerly point of recording was in Costa Rica. The specimens reported here were collected in a region of Amazon Forest with flight interception traps.

Biology
They are predatory on termites, where a group hunting strategy may be employed, or may prey more generally on invertebrates in the upper soil layer of forests. Little is known about their biology, but workers lack eyes and are well adapted to a subterranean lifestyle by way of burrowing. They also are equipped with short, spiny, and powerful legs. Nest sites are usually found near or even inside of termite nests.

Species

Centromyrmex alfaroi Emery, 1890
Centromyrmex angolensis Santschi, 1937
Centromyrmex bequaerti (Forel, 1913)
Centromyrmex brachycola (Roger, 1861)
Centromyrmex decessor Bolton & Fisher, 2008
Centromyrmex ereptor Bolton & Fisher, 2008
Centromyrmex feae (Emery, 1889)
Centromyrmex fugator Bolton & Fisher, 2008
Centromyrmex gigas Forel, 1911
Centromyrmex hamulatus (Karavaiev, 1925)
Centromyrmex longiventris Santschi, 1919
Centromyrmex praedator Bolton & Fisher, 2008
Centromyrmex raptor Bolton & Fisher, 2008
Centromyrmex secutor Bolton & Fisher, 2008
Centromyrmex sellaris Mayr, 1896

References

External links

Ponerinae
Ant genera
Pantropical fauna